Ivan Viktorovych Dovhodko (born 15 January 1989) is a Ukrainian rower. He competed in the quadruple sculls at the 2012 and 2016 Summer Olympics. He won the gold medal in the quadruple sculls at the 2014 World Rowing Championships in Amsterdam, setting a new world's best time.  He has won a gold, two silvers and a bronze in the quadruple sculls at European level.

His sister Nataliya is also an Olympic rower.  His father, Viktor Dovgodko, and his mother, Valentine Dovgodko, were also both international rowers.

He was originally coached by Raisa Kirilova at the "Burevisnyk" Kyiv club, before being coached by Maxim Mulyarchuk.  While coached by Mulyarchuk, he was part of the Ukrainian team that won bronze in the quadruple sculls at the 2005 World Junior Championship.  In 2008 when he aged out of junior rowing, he began being coached by Vladimir Opalnik.  Under Opalnik, he was part of the Ukrainian team that won silver at the 2009 World U-23 Championship.

As part of the Ukrainian national team, he is coached by Nikolai Dovgan.

References

External links

1989 births
Living people
Ukrainian male rowers
Sportspeople from Kyiv
Rowers at the 2012 Summer Olympics
Rowers at the 2016 Summer Olympics
Olympic rowers of Ukraine
World Rowing Championships medalists for Ukraine
Universiade silver medalists for Ukraine
Universiade medalists in rowing
Medalists at the 2013 Summer Universiade
Medalists at the 2015 Summer Universiade
Recipients of the Order of Danylo Halytsky